Omagh  railway passenger station served Omagh in  County Tyrone in Northern Ireland.

The Londonderry and Enniskillen Railway opened the first station on 13 September 1852.

A series of temporary stations, near the junction with the Portadown, Dungannon and Omagh Junction Railway, served the town until 3 March 1863 when a new, joint station - shared by the two companies (or, rather, their successors)- was opened  at the junction.

The station was taken over by the Great Northern Railway (Ireland) in 1883.

It closed on 15 February 1965.

Routes

References

Disused railway stations in County Tyrone
Railway stations opened in 1852
Railway stations closed in 1965
1852 establishments in Ireland
1965 disestablishments in Northern Ireland
Railway stations in Northern Ireland opened in the 19th century